Maggie's Back in Town!! is an album by trumpeter Howard McGhee which was recorded in 1961 and released on the Contemporary label.

Reception

Allmusic awarded the album 4½ stars, calling it "McGhee's finest recording of the period" and stating: "This CD is a perfect starting point for listeners not familiar with the underrated (and often overlooked) Howard McGhee".

Track listing 
 "Demon Chase" (Howard McGhee) - 7:50
 "Willow Weep for Me" (Ann Ronell) - 4:20
 "Softly, as in a Morning Sunrise" (Oscar Hammerstein II, Sigmund Romberg) - 3:13
 "Sunset Eyes" (Teddy Edwards) - 5:10
 "Maggie's Back in Town" (Edwards) - 10:36
 "Summertime" (George Gershwin, Ira Gershwin, DuBose Heyward) - 3:11
 "Brownie Speaks" (Clifford Brown) - 8:03

Personnel 
Howard McGhee - trumpet
Phineas Newborn, Jr. - piano
Leroy Vinnegar - bass
Shelly Manne - drums

References 

Howard McGhee albums
1961 albums
Contemporary Records albums